Wang Zhanyuan (February 20, 1861 – September 14, 1934) was a Chinese general of the Warlord Era of China's Republican period, whose power base was in Hubei province.

Biography 
In October 1911, during the Xinhai Revolution, he was a colonel and assigned the First Army, which fought against the revolutionaries of the Wuchang Uprising and commanded the 3rd Brigade of the Beiyang Army's 2nd Division. He was among the officers to be awarded the title batulu, which meant "brave warrior" in the Manchu language, soon after the Qing army captured Hankou. On November 28 Col. Wang was made commander of the 2nd Division, replacing Ma Longbiao, who fell ill.

Gallery

Sources

Citations

Literature 
 

1861 births
1934 deaths
Qing dynasty generals
Republic of China warlords from Hebei
Politicians from Handan
Empire of China (1915–1916)